Mary Wells was a singer.

Mary Wells may also refer to:
Mary Wells (album), a 1965 album by Mary Wells
Mary Wells (actress) (1762–1829), English actress
Mary K. Wells (1920–2000), American television writer and actress
Mary Fletcher Wells (died 1893), philanthropist, educator, and founder of the Trinity School
Mary Wells Lawrence (born 1928), retired American advertising executive
Mary Wells Morris (1764–1819), person that Wellsboro, Pennsylvania is named after

See also